Benton Douglas Brandon Jr. (August 23, 1932 – July 13, 1992) was an American lawyer and politician. He served in both the Arkansas House of Representatives and Arkansas Senate. In 1978, he was the Democratic nominee for Congress in Arkansas's 2nd congressional district.

References

External links
Doug Brandon at the Encyclopedia of Arkansas

1932 births
1992 deaths
20th-century American politicians
Democratic Party Arkansas state senators